"How Many Times Can We Say Goodbye" is a 1983 song by Dionne Warwick and Luther Vandross. The  ballad was issued as the lead single of Warwick's album of the same name, later appearing on Vandross' album Busy Body, both of which were released in 1983. 

The single was a top ten hit on both Billboards Hot Black Singles chart and Billboard's Adult Contemporary Chart, also reaching #27 on the Billboard Hot 100 and #36 on the Cash Box Top 100, becoming Luther Vandross' highest charting pop hit at the time until 1986.

Track listing
US Vinyl 7" single 45 RPM
A "How Many Times Can We Say Goodbye" (Dionne Warwick and Luther Vandross) – 3:27
B "What Can a Miracle Do" (Dionne Warwick) – 4:39

Charts

References

Songs about parting
1983 songs
1983 singles
Luther Vandross songs
Dionne Warwick songs
Contemporary R&B ballads
Pop ballads
Male–female vocal duets
Epic Records singles
Arista Records singles